The Greci (also: Valea Plopilor) is a small right tributary of the Danube (Măcin branch) in Romania. It flows into the Danube near Turcoaia.

References

Rivers of Romania
Rivers of Tulcea County